Zavolzhskoye is a rural locality (a selo) and the administrative center of Zavolzhsky Selsoviet, Kharabalinsky District, Astrakhan Oblast, Russia. The population was 1,467 as of 2010. There are 27 streets.

Geography 
Zavolzhskoye is located 65 km southeast of Kharabali (the district's administrative centre) by road. Rechnoye is the nearest rural locality.

References 

Rural localities in Kharabalinsky District